Mariya Kharitovna Savchenko (— 12 May 2005) was a milkmaid and politician from the Ukrainian SSR who was twice awarded the title Hero of Socialist Labor. 

She was a member of the Supreme Soviet of the Ukrainian Soviet Socialist Republic.

References

Heroes of Socialist Labour
Politicians of the Ukrainian Soviet Socialist Republic
Recipients of the Order of Lenin
20th-century Ukrainian women politicians